Walter Shanly (11 October 1817 – 17 December 1899) was a Canadian civil engineer, author, businessman, and politician. He was known for his work on railways and canals but was overshadowed by his brother, Francis Shanly.

Born in Stradbally, County Laois, Ireland, the son James Shanly and Frances Elizabeth Mulvany, he immigrated to Upper Canada in 1836.

In 1863, he was elected to the Legislative Assembly of the Province of Canada for the riding of Grenville South. In 1867, he was elected to the House of Commons of Canada for the riding of Greenville South. A Conservative, he was defeated in 1872 and 1874. He returned to politics upon the death of the current MP, William Thomas Benson, who died in 1885. He was acclaimed in the resulting by-election and was re-elected in 1887.

References
 
 

1817 births
1899 deaths
Irish emigrants to pre-Confederation Ontario
Conservative Party of Canada (1867–1942) MPs
Members of the House of Commons of Canada from Ontario
Members of the Legislative Assembly of the Province of Canada from Canada West
People from Stradbally
Politicians from County Laois
People from County Laois
Immigrants to Upper Canada